

Wilhelm Bleckwenn (21 October 1906  – 10 May 1989) was a German general in the Wehrmacht of Nazi Germany during World War II who commanded several divisions.  He was a recipient of the  Knight's Cross of the Iron Cross with Oak Leaves.

Awards and decorations

 German Cross in Gold on 14 April 1942 as Major in Infanterie-Regiment 487
 Knight's Cross of the Iron Cross with Oak Leaves
 Knight's Cross on 6 April 1944 as Oberst and commander of Grenadier-Regiment 487
 621st Oak Leaves on 18 October 1944 as Oberst and commander of Grenadier-Regiment 487

References

Citations

Bibliography

 
 

1906 births
1989 deaths
People from Osnabrück (district)
People from the Province of Hanover
Major generals of the German Army (Wehrmacht)
Recipients of the Gold German Cross
Recipients of the Knight's Cross of the Iron Cross with Oak Leaves
German prisoners of war in World War II held by the United Kingdom
Military personnel from Lower Saxony